The London Sessions Tour (known as MJB Live! in the United States) is the eighth headlining concert tour by American recording artist, Mary J. Blige. The tour supports Blige's twelfth studio album, The London Sessions. Beginning June 2016, the tour started in Europe playing various music festivals. During the fall of 2015, Blige briefly performed in the United States.

Opening acts
Tamar Braxton 
Damon Williams 
Keyshia Cole

Setlist
The following setlist was performed June 30, 2015, at the Mitsubishi Electric Halle in Düsseldorf, Germany. It does not represent all concerts for the duration of the tour.

"Just Fine"
"The One"
"You Bring Me Joy" 
"Love Is All We Need" / "Real Love" / "Be Happy" 
"Love No Limit"
"Enough Cryin"
"I Can Love You"
"Don't Mind"
"Share My World"
"Seven Days"
"Your Child"
"Take Me as I Am"
"Good Woman Down"
"My Life"
"Doubt"
"Therapy"
"Nobody But You"
"My Loving"
"F for You"
"I'm Goin' Down"
"Not Gon' Cry"
"No More Drama"
"One"
Encore
"Be Without You"
"Family Affair"

Tour dates

Festivals and other miscellaneous performances
Glastonbury Festival
Wireless Festival
Essence Music Festival
Montreux Jazz Festival
North Sea Jazz Festival
SoulFest Asia

References

Mary J. Blige concert tours
2015 concert tours